The Best of Platinum Collection is a compilation album by Italian singer Mina, released on 15 October 2007 by EMI. The album features selected tracks from the compilations The Platinum Collection (2004) and The Platinum Collection 2 (2006). The song "Uappa" was also added, which was not included in the previous compilations. All songs are arranged in chronological order. In 2009, the album received a gold certification in Italy.

Track listing

Charts

Certifications and sales

References

External links
 

2007 compilation albums
Mina (Italian singer) compilation albums
EMI Records compilation albums